Basnayake may refer to:

Asantha Basnayake (born 1987), Sri Lankan cricketer
B. M. U. D. Basnayake, Sri Lankan civil servant
Bandula Basnayake (born 1947), Sri Lankan politician, a former member of parliament and government minister
Eric Basnayake, Sri Lankan Judge
Hema Henry Basnayake, QC (born 1902) was the 31st Chief Justice of Ceylon
Nirmala Basnayake, vocalist in controller.controller, a Canadian indie rock band from Toronto, Ontario
Sinha Basnayake, PC, Sri Lankan lawyer
Tharanath Basnayake, Sri Lankan politician, a member of the Parliament of Sri Lanka
Basnayake Shalith Malinda Warnapura (born 1979), former professional Sri Lankan cricketer

Sinhalese surnames